North Main Street Historic District is a national historic district located at East Hampton in Suffolk County, New York. The district includes 20 contributing buildings, two contributing structures, and two contributing sites.  It includes 12 residential properties, one church, one cemetery, and one windmill.

It was added to the National Register of Historic Places in 1988.

References

Historic districts on the National Register of Historic Places in New York (state)
East Hampton (village), New York
Historic districts in Suffolk County, New York
National Register of Historic Places in Suffolk County, New York